The Haute Touche Zoological Park is a zoo and safari park in France. It is located in Obterre, and is part of the Muséum national d'histoire naturelle. The zoo was established in 1958 and opened to the public in 1980. The zoo has animals in semi-freedom, in relatively large enclosures. Visitors can see about 920 animals from 85 species and five continents, including a remarkable collection of deer. The park includes several sections, including European fauna such as Alpine ibex, European bison, gray wolves and wild boar, threatened ungulates such as Formosan sika deer, Père David's deer and scimitar oryx, and general fauna from the Americas, Asia and Africa such as big cats, hyenas, baboons, lemurs, giraffe, antelopes and birds.

References

Safari parks
Zoos in France
Tourist attractions in Centre-Val de Loire
Zoos established in 1958
1958 establishments in France
Organizations based in Centre-Val de Loire